Cedar Rock Falls (Cedar Rock Creek Falls, Falls on Cedar Rock Creek) is a waterfall in Transylvania County, North Carolina, USA.

Geology
Cedar Rock Falls is a 20' waterfall located on Cedar Rock Creek, near the Pisgah Center for Wildlife Education and Fish Hatchery in Pisgah National Forest, North Carolina. It is located downstream of the junction of Cedar Rock and Grogan Creeks. The junction lies in a small, flat valley plateau known as Picklesimer Fields. The combined stream, called Cedar Rock Creek, flows from this plateau over a series of falls and cascades.

Features
The falls is located in an area rich with mosses, eastern hemlock, and Rosebay Rhododendron. A rich spray-cliff plant community exists behind the falls, in the microclimate which is moderated by the falling water and spray mist.

Visiting the Falls
From the intersection of U.S. Highway 276, U.S. Highway 64, and NC Highway 280 in Brevard, North Carolina, travel north for 5.2 miles and head west of Forest Road 475, traveling 1.5 miles to the trailhead at the fish hatchery. The 0.81 mile moderate-difficulty trail follows the Cat Gap Loop trail.

Nearby falls
Grogan Creek Falls
Looking Glass Falls
Slick Rock Falls
Moore Cove Falls
Sliding Rock
Log Hollow Falls
Falls on Log Hollow Branch

References

Protected areas of Transylvania County, North Carolina
Waterfalls of North Carolina
Pisgah National Forest
Waterfalls of Transylvania County, North Carolina